Emmanuel Bamidele (born 6 July 1999) is a Nigerian athlete.

The winner of the men's 400m at the Nigerian Commonwealth Games Trials in Abuja in 2018 with a time of 45:28 which placed him inside the world top 60 in the event by the end of the year.
Soon after however, there were reports that Bamidele left the Nigerian camp and was weighing up an offer to represent Qatar. By 3 May 2019 Bamidele was representing Qatar in the 400m at the 2019 Doha Diamond League at the Khalifa International Stadium in which he finished second.

By 2022 Bamidele was running for Texas A&M, finishing fourth at the outdoor SEC championships 400m and qualifying for the outdoors NCAA final 400m but did not compete in the final. He ran 45.78 seconds to finish third in the NCAA indoors and anchored the  relay team to victory.

References

1999 births
Living people